Mary Casey may refer to:

 Mary Ann Casey (born 1949), retired American diplomat, former ambassador to Algeria and Tunisia
 Mary Casey (Neighbours), fictional character from the Australian soap opera Neighbours.
 Mary Hutchison n. Casey (born 1915), National President of the Scottish Co-operative Women's Guild.